Kandilli Observatory, or more formally Kandilli Observatory and Earthquake Research Institute (KOERI) is a Turkish observatory, which is also specialized on earthquake research. It is situated in Kandilli neighborhood of Üsküdar district on the Anatolian side of Istanbul, atop a hill overlooking Bosporus.

History
The observatory, named originally "Imperial Observatory" as established in 1868 in the Rumelian side of Istanbul, was dedicated mainly to weather forecasting and accurate timekeeping.

During the 31 March Incident in 1909, the observatory was destroyed by the rebels. Next year, however, Professor Fatin (later Fatin Gökmen) was tasked with the reestablishment of the observatory. He chose the present place as the location in of the observatory. Systematic research works began on July 1, 1911. After several name changes, the name "Kandilli Observatory, Astronomy and Geophysics" came into use in 1940. In 1982, the observatory was annexed to Boğaziçi University. Later, the institution was renamed Kandilli Observatory and Earthquake Research Institute (KOERI).

Structure of the institution
Kandilli Observatory consists of following departments, laboratories and other facilities situated within its campus:

Departments
 Earthquake engineering
 Geodesy
 Geophysics

Laboratories
 Astronomy
 Geomagnetism
 Meteorology
 Optics

Other facilities
 Earthquake museum
 National Earthquake Monitoring Center
 Magnetics Monitoring Station
 Geodesy and Magnetics Monitoring Station	
 Disaster Preparedness Education Unit
 Sun Tower
 Institute for Biomedical engineering
 Telecommunication and Informatics Research Center

In addition, following centers are run by the observatory outside the campus:
 Belbaşı Nuclear Tests Monitoring Center, formerly Belbaşı Seismic Research Station (Belbaşı, Ankara Province)
 İznik Center for Reducing of Earthquake Damages (Iznik Deprem Zararlarinin Azaltilmasi Merkezi) (Iznik, Bursa Province)

References

Seismological observatories, organisations and projects
Boğaziçi University
Üsküdar
Geophysical observatories
Geomagnetism
1868 establishments in the Ottoman Empire
Meteorological observatories
Astronomical observatories in Turkey
Scientific organizations based in Turkey